The Itaúnas River is a river of Espírito Santo state in eastern Brazil.

The river approaches the coast at the settlement of Itaúnas and then runs southwest, parallel to the coast behind a sand bar, before entering the Atlantic Ocean to the north of Conceição da Barra.

See also
List of rivers of Espírito Santo

References

Sources

Rivers of Espírito Santo